Heil og sæl (English: lit. healthy and happy) is a common greeting in Iceland.

Etymology 
Originally a Norse greeting, “heil og sæl” had the form “heill ok sæll” when addressed to a man and “heil ok sæl” when addressed to a woman. Other versions were “ver heill ok sæll” (lit. be healthy and happy) and simply “heill” (lit. healthy).

The Norwegian adjective heil (also hel) is related to the English adjective whole/hale. The Norwegian verb heile (also hele) is related to the English verb heal through their common origin, the Germanic word stem *haila-, from which also the German verb heilen and the adjective „heile“, i.e. functioning / not defect descends.

The Norwegian adjective sæl, meaning happy or glad, is in Old English documented only in the negated variant unsǣle, meaning evil.

20th-century use 
According to Store norske leksikon, the originally Norse greeting “heill ok sæll” was—adjusted to modern orthography and pronunciation—adopted as “heil og sæl” by the political party Nasjonal Samling. According to Bokmålsordboka, the adoption was inspired by Germany's “Heil Hitler” and similar.

During the 1940–1945 German occupation of Norway, Nasjonal Samling, being the governing and only legal political party, sought to introduce all parts of society to a greeting combining “heil og sæl” and a raised right hand. Whilst the attempt was not successful, the said greeting remained compulsory for party members and police. It has subsequently remained closely associated with nationalism.

See also
 Ave
 Ave Imperator, morituri te salutant
 Bellamy salute
 Olympic salute
 Roman salute
 Zogist salute

References 
Notes

Further reading
 Bjorvand, Harald and Lindemand, Fredrik Otto: Våre arveord : Etymologisk ordbok 2nd edition. 2001, Oslo. Novus forlag. 
 Heggstad, Leiv et al.: Norrøn ordbok 5th edition. 2012, Oslo. Det Norske Samlaget. 

Greeting words and phrases
Norway in World War II